William Frederick Webb (1829–1899) was a High Sheriff of Nottinghamshire and officer in the British Army.

Background and early life
William Frederick Webb was born in Sussex in March 1829, one of four children of Frederick Webb and Mary Shiel. His father, who died on 4 February 1846, was an illegitimate son of Sir John Webb, having a brother John who had been declared a lunatic. John Webb, who stood to inherit an income from the estates of Sir John, was at that time under medical care, in France, and had an illegitimate daughter. A court case began in April 1846. Ultimately, William Frederick Webb inherited estates in Yorkshire, Lincolnshire and County Durham, making him a wealthy man.

Webb was educated at Eton College and later joined the army, becoming a Captain in the 17th Lancers.

Later life
 
A big-game hunter, particularly of rhinoceros, Webb spent time in Africa with a friend, Captain William Codrington. In 1851 Webb became ill with fever and they summoned the explorer David Livingstone to assist. Webb recovered and came to know the Livingstones at Kolobeng Mission.

In 1860, Webb, now married, resided at Pepper Hall in Yorkshire. He purchased Newstead Abbey in Nottinghamshire from Thomas Wildman, a deal completed in 1861, for £147,000. Another potential purchaser had been Queen Victoria. He moved his family into the Abbey, and set about improvements, installing heating and gas lighting and also redecorating the old chapel. His wife sought out memorabilia of Lord Byron, who had owned it.

Webb's hunting trophies remain in Newstead today: the tusks, skins and heads of the animals he killed while in Africa. Livingstone made regular trips to Newstead, sometimes staying for months.

Webb was also a magistrate. In 1865 he became High Sheriff of Nottinghamshire.

In 1889, Emilia Jane Webb became ill with tuberculosis and journeyed to Africa in October that year, in hope that the warm climate would help her recovery. On 28 December 1889, she died, aged 63. She was buried in the cemetery of St John's church, Wynberg, Cape Town, South Africa. The white marble grave is still in good condition as at 2009 and states her age at death as being 55. It features a design on it that reflects motifs seen throughout Newstead Abbey.

Ten years later, in 1899, Webb contracted laryngitis while in Africa. He died from it and is buried at Luxor in Egypt.

When Webb died, Newstead Abbey was passed through each of his surviving children until Webb's grandson Charles Ian Fraser sold it to Sir Julien Cahn, who then gave it to Nottingham City Council in 1931.

NB: the portrait of WFW may actually be a portrait of Richard James Butterfield esq. born Edinburgh, Scotland. His service in the British Army (from 15 years old to 47 years old), was principally as a Captain/18th Hussars. He appears as himself (centre/ground); in the painting: 'The Return from Balaclava'. His life (in-part), is very much as described above. An Explorer and so called; 'Big Game Hunter'; he was responsible for the Collection of Trophies: Wollaton Hall and Deer Park (Wollaton, Nottingham). As a Registered Prospector in the Diamond Industry associated with De Beers; he went by another name: that of Cecil Rhodes. It was he who founded the Number One Shot Mine Kimberley, Cape Province. For the record; Richard James Butterfield esq. was posted missing in 1899; the first year of the South African War (the so called Boer War). Having survived the Battle of Omdurman/Sudan (the previous year: 1898), he had returned to Britain, in the wake of his son's death. Having settled his son's affairs in Nottingham and Glasgow he returned to Africa as a Brigadier in the Sherwood Rangers (in-part Naval Division/Royal Naval Reserve).

Family
On 15 July 1857, Webb married Emilia Jane, daughter of Thomas Mills Goodlake of Wadley House at Littleworth in Berkshire (now Oxfordshire), and sister of Gerald Goodlake VC. Together they had seven children:
 
 Wilfred Webb (1858) (died at three months)
 Augusta Zelia Webb (1859), writer, married Philip Affleck Fraser.
 Geraldine Katharine Webb (1860), married Herbert Chermside.
 Ethel Mary Webb (1863)
 Mabel C. Webb (1864)
 Algernon F. Webb (1866) 
 Roderick B. Webb (1867).

References

External links 
  Newstead Abbey 
  Newstead Abbey information
Tourist information on Newstead Abbey

1829 births
1899 deaths
17th Lancers officers
People educated at Eton College
High Sheriffs of Nottinghamshire
People from Brighton
People from Newstead, Nottinghamshire